The United States National Cyclocross Championships is a four-day competition held annually each winter and is sponsored by USA Cycling.  The winners at various levels, including elite, U-23, masters, juniors, and collegiate for men and women, wear the coveted stars and stripes jersey and are crowned United States national cyclo-cross champions.

Past winners

Men

Women

References

National cyclo-cross championships
Cycle races in the United States
Recurring events with year of establishment missing